Tiny Toon Adventures: Plucky's Big Adventure is the third Tiny Toon Adventures-based game, developed by Warthog, published by Conspiracy Games and released on the PlayStation in North America on September 21, 2001 and in Europe on the following month.

Gameplay
The game's focus is on Plucky Duck, the green-feathered co-star of the Tiny Toon Adventures cartoon. Based around an actual episode of the series, Plucky is attempting to build a time machine because he forgot to do his homework. However, he needs the help of the other cast members to find the needed parts to finish the time machine.

In this mission, the player controls one of four characters, each in their own chapter: Plucky Duck, Hamton J. Pig, Babs Bunny, and Buster Bunny. The player hunts around Acme Looniversity finding the required items using clues picked up in the game. The player must then trade out items as found before finally obtaining the required item needed for the chapter. Familiar faces from the series appear during the mission and often offer their help. Elmyra Duff and Montana Max are hindrances, capturing the player if they can. The game ends with Plucky trying to go back in time, but his Time Machine breaks, throwing him against the wall. Buster teaches a lesson about doing homework ahead of time.

Reception
The game was not well reviewed by IGN. They said that "Plucky's Big Adventure is an abomination of a game", and rated the game a 2.3 out of 10. PlayStation magazine gave the game 1.5 out of 5, and PSX Nation rated it 54%.

References

External links
Warthog Sweden/42-Bit AB page

2001 video games
Platform games
PlayStation (console)-only games
Video games based on Tiny Toon Adventures
Video games developed in the United Kingdom
PlayStation (console) games
Conspiracy Entertainment games
Single-player video games